Cyril Grant (10 July 1920 – 2002) was an English professional footballer. He was born in Wath, Yorkshire.

Grant started his career with Lincoln City during World War II as a centre forward. He was transferred to Arsenal in August 1946 as a possible replacement for Ted Drake, but he spent only five months with the club. During this time he played two league matches before being transferred to Fulham in January 1947 as part of a swap deal for Ronnie Rooke.

He scored four goals in fourteen league matches for Fulham, but he left the club in March 1948 for Southend United of the Third Division South. In seven years with the club, he scored 64 goals in 183 matches. He finished his career with Gravesend & Northfleet.

References

1920 births
2002 deaths
English footballers
Arsenal F.C. players
Lincoln City F.C. players
Fulham F.C. players
Southend United F.C. players
Ebbsfleet United F.C. players
Sportspeople from Yorkshire
Association football forwards